Donje Ljupče ( or ) is a village located in the municipality of Podujevo, in northeastern Kosovo.

It was mentioned in the 1455 defter as having 76 houses.

Annotations

References

Villages in Podujevo